The 1874 Liverpool by-election was fought on 14 March 1874.  The byelection was fought due to the incumbent Conservative MP, Viscount Sandon, becoming Vice-President of the Committee of the Council on Education.  It was retained by the incumbent.

References

1874 elections in the United Kingdom
1874 in England
1870s in Liverpool
Liverpoool, 1874
Unopposed ministerial by-elections to the Parliament of the United Kingdom in English constituencies
March 1874 events